1947 was the 48th season of County Championship cricket in England. It is chiefly remembered for the batting performances of Denis Compton and Bill Edrich who established seasonal records that, with the subsequent reduction in the number of first-class matches, will probably never be broken. Their form was key to their team Middlesex winning the County Championship for the first time since 1921, although they were involved in a tight contest for the title with the eventual runners-up Gloucestershire, for whom Tom Goddard was the most outstanding bowler of the season. Compton and Edrich were assisted by the fact that it was the driest and sunniest English summer for a generation, ensuring plenty of good batting wickets.

The South Africans, captained by Alan Melville, toured the British Isles for the first time since 1935 and played a Test series of five matches against England, who won the series 3–0 with two matches drawn, again largely thanks to the batting of Compton and Edrich. The South Africans enjoyed greater success in first-class matches against the English county teams, losing only one and winning eleven. Other notable fixtures played include the University Match, Gentlemen v Players (twice) and North v South (three matches). The Minor Counties Championship was won by Yorkshire II, one of six first-class teams who entered their second elevens in the competition. Unusually, there were two tied matches in 1947, compared with two in the previous 21 years. Essex v Northamptonshire and Hampshire v Lancashire were the 20th and 21st tied matches in the history of first-class cricket worldwide since the earliest known instance in 1783.

The main source for information about the season is Wisden Cricketers' Almanack, in its 85th edition published in April 1948. This announced the five Wisden Cricketers of the Year for 1947: Martin Donnelly, Alan Melville, Dudley Nourse, Jack Robertson and Norman Yardley. 1947 was the first season to be reviewed by Playfair Cricket Annual, which began publication in April 1948.

Background
The main sources for the 1947 season are the 85th edition of Wisden Cricketers' Almanack and the inaugural edition of Playfair Cricket Annual, both published in April 1948. The 1947 season was therefore the first to be reviewed by Playfair.

The winter of 1946–47 in the United Kingdom was harsh with heavy snowfalls disrupting communication and supply for about six weeks from January to March. February was one of the coldest months on record and the winter culminated in the wettest March for 300 years. Yet it was followed by what Playfair called a "glorious summer" in which fine weather prevailed and, as Wisden says, "the sun shone throughout". This was in sharp contrast to the wet summer of 1946. Despite austerity and rationing, the country was still in post-war euphoria and there was great enthusiasm for sporting events. As Wisden reports, "crowds thronged the grounds (and) Lord's was often full for county games".

Wisden editor Hubert Preston commented in his 1948 editorial that "the season of 1947 bears favourable comparison with any year within living memory". He had expected the continuous fine weather to produce pitch conditions favourable to batsmen and hence the predominance of drawn matches but, as he wrote, "actually about three-quarters of the County Championship matches were won outright".

Playfair editor Peter West wrote that "a grand and glorious summer" had been "a feast amidst austerity indeed, a fine reward for months of waiting through a chill and infamous winter". West went on to claim that "nearly three million people", with the younger generation strongly represented, attended first-class cricket matches in 1947. It must be remembered that this means three million attendances and not literally three million people.

Honours
Test Series – England 3–0 South Africa; two matches drawn
County Championship – Middlesex
Minor Counties Championship – Yorkshire II
Wisden Cricketers of the Year – Martin Donnelly, Alan Melville, Dudley Nourse, Jack Robertson, Norman Yardley

South African tour

South Africa toured the British Isles in 1947 and played a five-match Test series against England, who won the series 3–0 with two matches drawn. This was the first South African tour of England since 1935, the team captained by Alan Melville who had played in England for Oxford University and Sussex. Wisden commented that despite their lack of success in the Test series, South Africa "gave indication of real ability at all points of the game" and "little more experience is necessary to make them really powerful" in international cricket. Playfair acclaimed the South Africans as a "most popular team (who) enriched the game and set an excellent example", the tour realising a profit of £10,000.

South Africa fared very well in their matches against the county clubs, winning eleven of the eighteen matches and losing only one, which was the opening match of the tour against Worcestershire by 39 runs. They lost to Marylebone Cricket Club (MCC) in May by 158 runs, but in September they had a convincing nine wicket win against the South who included Denis Compton, Bill Edrich and Jack Robertson.

The outstanding South African players were the three best batsmen: Melville, Bruce Mitchell and Dudley Nourse. Ken Viljoen had a good tour and made six centuries but none in the Tests. The bowling was moderate as no one took more than 15 wickets in the series or averaged under forty. Athol Rowan with 102 was the only tourist to take a century of wickets in the season. The team badly lacked pace bowlers and included only two medium-fast seamers, Jack Plimsoll and Lindsay Tuckett, the majority of bowlers being spinners: Rowan, Tufty Mann, Ian Smith and Leslie Payn. South Africa had three wicketkeepers in the party: Johnny Lindsay, Douglas Ovenstone and George Fullerton. Ossie Dawson was an all-rounder and the remaining batsmen were Denis Begbie, Dennis Dyer and Tony Harris. South Africa used fourteen players in the Test series: the ones who missed out were Begbie, Ovenstone and Payn.

Test series summary
 Trent Bridge – match drawn.
 Lord's – England won by 10 wickets.
 Old Trafford – England won by 7 wickets.
 Headingley – England won by 10 wickets.
 The Oval – match drawn.

England's key victory came in the second Test at Lord's where Compton (208) and Edrich (189) shared a partnership of 370 which was a then world record for the third wicket in Test cricket. Doug Wright took ten wickets in the match and England won by ten wickets. In the third Test at Old Trafford, Edrich scored 191 in another big partnership with Compton and took eight wickets in the match. England won the fourth Test at Headingley in only three days by ten wickets. This time it was Len Hutton and Cyril Washbrook who claimed the batting honours while the best bowler was Harold Butler with match figures of seven for 66 on debut.

England team in 1947
The England team began 1947 on tour in Australia, where they were beaten 3–0 in the Test series, and then toured New Zealand where the sole Test arranged was ruined by rain. Having played South Africa at home in 1947, England's next tour was to the West Indies beginning in January 1948.

England, playing under the auspices of MCC, took 17 players to Australia and New Zealand. Wally Hammond captained the side in his final Test series. The other batsmen were Len Hutton, Cyril Washbrook, Denis Compton, Bill Edrich, James Langridge, Laurie Fishlock and Joe Hardstaff junior. Jack Ikin and Norman Yardley were essentially all-rounders. Godfrey Evans and Paul Gibb were the wicketkeepers and the bowlers were Alec Bedser, Doug Wright, Dick Pollard, Peter Smith and Bill Voce. Gibb, Hardstaff, Hutton and Langridge did not play in New Zealand.

With Hammond having retired from international cricket, Yardley was appointed captain for the home series against South Africa. In the first Test, England recalled Eric Hollies and selected three debutants: Sam Cook, Tom Dollery and Jack Martin. Hutton, Washbrook, Edrich, Compton, Evans and Bedser were retained from the winter tour and these six with Yardley were the mainstays of the England team in 1947. There were changes again for the second Test with Charlie Barnett replacing Dollery, George Pope replacing Martin and Wright coming back in place of Cook. Bedser missed the third Test and was replaced by Cliff Gladwin while  Ken Cranston was brought in to replace Pope. In the fourth Test, Jack Young was introduced in place of Hollies and Harold Butler for Gladwin. Edrich missed the last Test, as again did Bedser, and there were yet more changes elsewhere with Dick Howorth coming in to replace Barnett and Bill Copson replacing Butler. Jack Robertson took Edrich's place. It all meant that, in a five-match series they won 3–0, England used 21 different players.

With so many players under consideration, it was difficult to predict who would go to the West Indies in the winter and that question became even more complex when several players decided not to go. Bedser, Compton, Edrich, Hutton, Wright and Yardley from the 1947 series all declined the tour before the squad was selected, as did Trevor Bailey who was in contention for a place. With Yardley missing, MCC reappointed pre-war captain Gubby Allen to lead the party but he was the first in a spate of injuries when he damaged a leg muscle on the outward voyage. Following further injuries to Dennis Brookes and Joe Hardstaff junior, Allen asked MCC to send reinforcements and Hutton then changed his mind, flying out just in time to play against British Guiana.

Of the players who went to the West Indies, the only ones who had played against South Africa in the summer were Hutton, Evans, Cranston, Robertson, Howorth and Butler. Hardstaff and Ikin had been to Australia and New Zealand the previous winter. The other eight were Allen and seven newcomers: Dennis Brookes, Billy Griffith, Jim Laker, Winston Place, Gerald Smithson, Maurice Tremlett and Johnny Wardle. Playfair was disappointed with the situation in the West Indies, especially as England were well beaten in the Test series. The team, it said, "could not be called great by any standards" as it was too "experimental" but it at least seemed "workmanlike" and in Laker a new star had been discovered. Playfair ominously concluded its review by reference to the 1948 Australian team being "about to descend upon us well armed in all key departments (and) we shall have to do better than this".

County Championship
Middlesex won the County Championship under the captaincy of Walter Robins, who stood down at the end of the season. He was well supported by slow left-arm spinner Jack Young, who took 159 wickets in all matches; off break bowler Jim Sims; pace bowler Laurie Gray; wicketkeeper Leslie Compton; and their quartet of high-scoring batsmen Denis Compton, Bill Edrich, Syd Brown and Jack Robertson. The Wisden editorial drew attention to an additional feat by Middlesex in defeating "The Rest" by nine wickets in the last match of the season at The Oval. Previously, only Yorkshire (1905 and 1935) had beaten The Rest, the fixture having lapsed from 1936 to 1946. Yorkshire had won the County Championship in 1946 but slipped to seventh place in 1947 and Wisden remarked on the retirement of "several veterans" after the 1946 season, although the highest innings score of the 1947 season, 270 not out, was achieved by Yorkshire's Len Hutton.

Playfair described the championship as "a great tussle" between Middlesex and Gloucestershire that was not settled until 28 August when Middlesex won their penultimate match, defeating bottom team Northamptonshire at Lord's by 355 runs. The key match, however, took place earlier in the month when Middlesex defeated Gloucestershire at Cheltenham by 68 runs. Middlesex had finished runners-up five times in succession: 1936 to 1939 and again in 1946. Since Middlesex's previous title in 1921, no southern team had won the championship and so their 1947 triumph ended 25 seasons of northern domination.

Gloucestershire v Middlesex, August 1947
The Gloucestershire v Middlesex match at the College Ground, Cheltenham was the ultimate decider of a close-fought championship. It began on Saturday, 16 August on the same day as the fifth Test at The Oval and Playfair remarked that "even the final Test seemed a matter of secondary importance". There was no play on Sundays in 1947 and the match continued into Monday, 18 August, when it was concluded with Tuesday to spare. Middlesex were without Compton and Robertson who were both playing for England but they did have Edrich, rested by England.

Middlesex won the toss and decided to bat, Brown and Edrich opening with a stand of 50 before Brown was out lbw to the seamer Colin Scott. Edrich went on to score 50 but, apart from some resistance by tailenders Sims and Young, Middlesex's batting collapsed as Gloucestershire's great off spinner Tom Goddard took seven for 70. Middlesex were all out for 180 but Sims (six for 65) and Young (four for 55) turned the tables and bowled out Gloucestershire for 153. At close of play on Saturday, Middlesex had reached 9 for 1 in their second innings, Goddard having taken the key wicket of Edrich, so Monday's play began with Middlesex ahead by 36 and nine wickets standing. The decisive phase of the match was a third wicket partnership on Monday morning between Harry Sharp and the captain Robins. Scoring 46 and 45 respectively, they shared a stand of 70 runs which Playfair described as "vital". Otherwise, Middlesex again collapsed and Goddard took eight for 86 to complete an outstanding match analysis of fifteen for 156. So Gloucestershire with a day and a half remaining needed 169 to win. Jack Crapp tried to hold the innings together and scored 40 but Gloucestershire were rolled over for only 100 to lose by 68 runs. Young took five for 27 but an important role was again played by Sharp, this time as an off spinner, taking the wickets of three of Gloucestershire's top six batsmen, two of them without scoring. Playfair points out that Sharp at the time was still only a member of the Lord's ground staff but he played the key part in winning the match that ultimately settled the championship.

Season finale
Gloucestershire had gone into the Cheltenham match with a lead of four points in the championship table and the immediate outcome was that Middlesex overtook them to lead by eight points, both teams having four matches still to be played. Middlesex had to play Derbyshire away, "always difficult to beat", and three home matches against Surrey, Northamptonshire and third-placed Lancashire whom Playfair termed "the toughest nut to crack". Playfair considered Gloucestershire's programme to be easier as they faced four moderate teams: Glamorgan at Cheltenham, Hampshire and Sussex away, and Essex at Bristol.

There was no change after the first two matches as Gloucestershire beat Glamorgan in two days and Middlesex won the difficult encounter at Derby. It all went wrong for Gloucestershire at Dean Park, Bournemouth where stubborn Hampshire batting forced a draw while Middlesex were defeating Surrey with some ease. This gave Middlesex a twenty-point lead and only two matches each to be played. Middlesex's victory over the bottom team Northants settled it, especially as Gloucestershire surprisingly lost to Sussex by nine wickets. Even so, there was a slight sting in the tail as Middlesex then lost their final match to a determined Lancashire by 64 runs while Gloucestershire rallied to defeat Essex. The final table showed Middlesex winning by twenty points, on the face of it a handsome margin, but in reality it was a much closer contest than the figures would suggest.

Final table
The seventeen first-class county teams played a total of 26 matches each. Twelve points were awarded for a win and six to each team if the result was a tie, as happened twice in 1947. Teams leading on first innings who subsequently drew or lost the match were awarded four points. Essex were awarded two points in one match they lost after a tie on first innings.

The final championship table was as follows:

Tied matches
Tied matches are a rarity in cricket and there had been only two County Championship ties in the previous 21 years. Essex and Somerset had tied in 1926, then Worcestershire and Somerset in 1939. In 1947, there were two tied matches: Essex v Northamptonshire and Hampshire v Lancashire. Playfair noted that these were the 20th and 21st tied matches in the history of first-class cricket worldwide since the earliest known instance in 1783.

The Essex v Northamptonshire match was played at Valentines Park, Ilford 17 to 20 May. Northamptonshire won the toss and decided to bat, scoring 215 all out with a top score of 49 by Vince Broderick while Essex's Test leg break and googly bowler Peter Smith took four for 65. By close of play on Saturday, Essex had replied to 170 for 4 with opener Chick Cray on 90 not out. He completed his century, exactly 100, on Monday morning and Essex went on to total 267 all out. Northamptonshire were 219 for 5 at the close on Monday evening with their veteran batsman John Timms on 90 not out. Timms was out for 112 on Tuesday morning and Peter Smith completed ten in the match by taking six for 84 in the Northamptonshire total of 291. Essex therefore needed 240 to win with ample time left on the final day. They had a good stand of 103 for the fourth wicket between Frank Vigar (60) and Len Clark (64) but spinners Broderick and Bertie Clarke kept picking up the wickets and Essex were still ten behind when the ninth went down. The last pair were captain Tom Pearce and wicketkeeper Tom Wade who managed to level the scores before Wade was bowled by Clarke to tie the match.

Hampshire v Lancashire was played at Dean Park, Bournemouth on 27 to 29 August. Hampshire batted first and scored 363, the innings continuing into the Thursday morning, Jim Bailey with 95 the top scorer. Lancashire captain Ken Cranston had taken four for 73 and he led the Lancashire reply with 155 not out before declaring the innings closed at 367 for 9. Hampshire safely negotiated the last few overs on Thursday evening to close on 18 for 0 before totalling 224 for 7 declared on Friday, Jim Bailey again the top scorer with 63. This was a sporting declaration by the Hampshire captain Desmond Eagar as there was time to bowl only 47 overs before the close. Cyril Washbrook led the chase with 105 while Jim Bailey, having twice starred with the bat, took six for 82. When the last over began, Lancashire had reached 220 for 8 with Jack Ikin and wicketkeeper Alfred Barlow batting, but this was the last wicket as William Roberts had been taken to hospital with a broken finger and could not bat. Ikin and Barlow came together at 204 for 8 and so had added 16 for the final wicket to level the scores. Barlow was on strike and facing off spinner Gerry Hill. The first three balls produced no run and then Barlow was run out as he tried for a quick single to end the match in a tie.

Middlesex
As Playfair put it, "few will dispute that the best side won the championship". Middlesex's first four batsmen — Robertson, Brown, Edrich and Compton — scored between them 12,193 runs in all first-class matches, a level of success unprecedented in county cricket. The other batting positions were contested by George Mann, who was heir-apparent to Robins as club captain and succeeded him in 1948; Alan Fairbairn, a 1947 debutant who scored centuries in each of his first two county matches; Harry Sharp and Alec Thompson. The three main bowlers were Gray, Young and the veteran Sims. Ian Bedford, aged seventeen, made his debut and took twelve wickets in his first two matches. Middlesex also made effective use as bowlers of Robins, Edrich and Denis Compton. Playfair noted the consistently high standard of the Middlesex fielding, especially by Brown, while Leslie Compton as wicket-keeper was a great success. Middlesex made exclusive use of Lord's Cricket Ground in St John's Wood, north London, for their thirteen home matches.

Gloucestershire
Gloucestershire's strong challenge for the title was despite the loss of Wally Hammond but in Tom Goddard they had the best bowler in the country. He took 238 wickets in all matches, 61 more than his nearest rival. He was well supported by Sam Cook who took 120 championship wickets and gained a Test call, but the team lacked quality pace bowlers with George Lambert largely on his own apart from the medium pace of Test batsman Charlie Barnett. Five Gloucestershire batsmen scored over 1,000 runs in the championship: captain Basil Allen, Barnett, Jack Crapp, George Emmett and wicket-keeper Andy Wilson. Playfair recorded concerns about the pitch at Bristol which was alleged by some to have been prepared especially for Goddard. It is true that Gloucestershire won eight of the nine matches played there but equally true that Goddard took most of his wickets in matches not at Bristol. Ken Graveney made his debut for Gloucestershire in 1947 and his brother Tom was waiting in the wings. Other players included Monty Cranfield, Bev Lyon, Clifford Monks, William Neale, Grahame Parker, Colin Scott and Alfred Wilcox.

Gloucestershire generally used their headquarters in Bristol, playing nine of their fourteen home matches there. All the venues were:
 Ashley Down Ground, Bristol
 College Ground, Cheltenham
 Wagon Works Ground, Gloucester

Lancashire
Lancashire finished third for the second season in succession. They lost only once (to Somerset) but drew ten and tied one. They were well served by their openers Cyril Washbrook and Winston Place who both scored more than 2,000 runs in all first-class matches, Washbrook playing in all five Tests and Place being selected for the West Indies tour. There were problems in the middle order where only Geoff Edrich performed consistently well, but the two Test all-rounders, Jack Ikin and captain Ken Cranston scored over 1,000 runs. Lancashire's outstanding bowler was paceman Dick Pollard who finished the season strongly after an indifferent early phase and took 144 wickets in all matches. Slow left armer William Roberts bowled steadily and took 74 championship wickets but Playfair remarked that he was short of Test class. As with the batting, the all-rounders Cranston and Ikin shored up the bowling with 56 and 48 championship wickets respectively. Looking to the future, Lancashire made a "find" in wicketkeeper Alfred Barlow and there were good reports of Alan Wharton who became a Lancashire stalwart for many seasons. Batsman Barry Howard played some good innings in his debut season and, along with Cranston, was awarded his county cap. Other players included future county captain Nigel Howard, Tom Brierley, Phil King in his final season, future Test umpire Eddie Phillipson, Eric Price, and Gordon Garlick who joined Northamptonshire in 1948.

Lancashire played the majority of their home matches at their Old Trafford headquarters and played two matches elsewhere in the county:
 Aigburth Cricket Ground, Liverpool
 Old Trafford Cricket Ground, Manchester
 Stanley Park, Blackpool

Kent
Kent improved from seventh to fourth and were able to announce increased attendances and membership. The team was again captained by Bryan Valentine and featured England stars Godfrey Evans and Doug Wright, though they missed several championship matches for Test calls. Kent were particularly well served by their batsmen, although Valentine had problems with loss of form at times. Les Ames, Les Todd and Arthur Fagg all scored more than 2,000 runs in the season. The young left-hander Peter Hearn was regarded as a fine prospect and was awarded his county cap. Wright was the main bowler and was supported by off spinner Ray Dovey, all-rounder Jack Davies and the two pacemen Fred Ridgway and Norman Harding. Harding died unexpectedly in September, aged 31. Other players included Geoffrey Anson, Brian Edrich, the veteran Hopper Levett in his final season, Tony Mallett, future captain Bill Murray-Wood and Tony Pawson. A curious case was pace bowler Jack Martin, who played for Kent only twice in 1947 and yet was selected to play for England in the Trent Bridge Test.

Kent's policy was to play home matches throughout the county and they used seven venues:
 Bat and Ball Ground, Gravesend
 Crabble Athletic Ground, Dover
 Garrison Ground 2, Gillingham
 Mote Park, Maidstone
 St Lawrence Ground, Canterbury
 Nevill Ground, Royal Tunbridge Wells
 Rectory Field, Blackheath

Derbyshire

Derbyshire was the most improved team of the year, rising ten places from fifteenth in 1946 to fifth in 1947. They were a strong bowling side with pacemen Bill Copson, Cliff Gladwin and George Pope all playing for England. Dusty Rhodes, bowling mainly leg break, and left-armer Eric Marsh provided support. Derbyshire, captained for the first time by Edward Gothard, played attacking cricket and were involved in several close finishes. The batting was weakened by injuries to Stan Worthington, in his final season, and Denis Smith. Charlie Elliott and Arnold Townsend topped 1,000 runs but Playfair noted that the presence of one really top-class batsman would have made an enormous difference to Derbyshire's batting. John Eggar, who topped the county averages, might have filled that gap but his teaching career enabled him to play only in August. Smith was seconded to keep wicket for most of the season until George Dawkes, formerly of Leicestershire, was able to join the team. Dawkes went on to become one of the greatest English wicketkeepers. Another notable debutant was fast bowler Les Jackson. Other players included Albert Alderman, 55-year-old Harry Elliott in his final season, Alan Revill and Pat Vaulkhard.

Most of Derbyshire's home matches were played at one of their two main venues in Derby and Chesterfield but they occasionally played elsewhere. The five venues used were:
 County Ground, Derby
 Queen's Park, Chesterfield
 Abbeydale Park, Dore
 Rutland Recreation Ground, Ilkeston
 Park Road, Buxton

Surrey
Surrey showed improvements on 1946 but Playfair remarked on "the need for new blood". Having said that, the arrival of Jim Laker certainly resolved any problems in spin bowling and his future partner Tony Lock was already making progress at second eleven level. Another good start was made by opening batsman David Fletcher who was awarded his county cap with Laker and Eric Bedser. Six Surrey batsmen topped 1,000 runs in the championship: Eric Bedser, Fletcher, captain Errol Holmes, Tom Barling, John Parker and Stan Squires. Laurie Fishlock had a chequered season having been dogged by serious illness since he went to Australia with England in the winter. Wicketkeeper Arthur McIntyre played well and produced some good batting performances. The main bowlers were Alec Bedser, Jim Laker and the retiring Alf Gover, who took 121 wickets in his final season. Seamer Eddie Watts could make only a few appearances due to injury. Geoffrey Whittaker made eight appearances and two future Surrey mainstays Bernie Constable and Stuart Surridge also played.

Surrey played twelve of their thirteen home matches at The Oval and one in Guildford. Two first-class matches not involving the Surrey XI were played in Kingston-upon-Thames. All venues:
 The Oval, Kennington, south London
 Woodbridge Road, Guildford
 Leyland Motors Ground, Kingston-upon-Thames

Worcestershire
Following the emigration of Sandy Singleton to Rhodesia after the 1946 season, Allan White succeeded him as Worcestershire captain. The team lacked batting strength and did well to improve their championship position. The outstanding player was Test all-rounder Dick Howorth who was, as in 1946, the first player to complete the double of 1,000 runs and 100 wickets. Howorth was a slow left arm spinner and formed a successful partnership with Peter Jackson who bowled mostly off breaks. Howorth took 164 wickets in all matches and Jackson 125. Future England player Roly Jenkins made a telling contribution (67 wickets) with his leg breaks and googlies while paceman Reg Perks took 123 wickets in all matches. The success of the bowlers owed much to keeper Hugo Yarnold who claimed the most victims in the championship. Howorth, Jenkins, Eddie Cooper and, in his first full season, Don Kenyon all exceeded 1,000 runs. Worcestershire's best known batsmen at the time were Charles Palmer and the veteran Bob Wyatt and they were the first two in the county averages but neither played a full season. Laddie Outschoorn qualified for the championship for the first time and showed promise. Other players included Ronald Bird, Fred Cooper (brother of Eddie), Norman Whiting and Martin Young.

Worcestershire played nine of their thirteen home matches at their County Ground headquarters in Worcester and used five venues in all:
 Chester Road North Ground, Kidderminster
 New Road, Worcester
 Tipton Road, Dudley
 War Memorial Ground, Amblecote
 Racecourse Ground, Hereford

Yorkshire
Yorkshire fell from champions to seventh and used 25 different players in the championship alone. There was future promise in five new caps: wicketkeeper Don Brennan, batsmen Willie Watson and Gerald Smithson, fast bowler Alec Coxon and left arm spinner Johnny Wardle. In addition, future stalwart Ted Lester began his career with three successive centuries and topped the county averages. Future captain Vic Wilson made a few appearances. Brian Sellers captained the team for the final time before handing over to Norman Yardley for the 1948 season. Bill Bowes in his final season topped the bowling averages and received a record benefit. He was supported by Wardle, off spinner Ellis Robinson, seamer Frank Smailes and new pace bowlers Coxon and Ron Aspinall. Yorkshire were hit by the loss through illness, after only four matches, of slow left armer Arthur Booth, who had been their outstanding player in 1946. The batting was generally not up to scratch and relied far too much on one man, the great Len Hutton who, because of Test calls, played in only half of Yorkshire's championship matches. Other players included Harry Crick, Harry Halliday, Freddie Jakeman, Geoffrey Keighley and pace bowler John Whitehead.

Yorkshire used seven venues in various parts of the county:
 Bramall Lane, Sheffield
 Fartown Ground, Huddersfield
 Headingley Cricket Ground, Leeds
 North Marine Road Ground, Scarborough
 Park Avenue, Bradford
 St George's Road Cricket Ground, Harrogate
 The Circle, Kingston upon Hull

Glamorgan
Glamorgan never had a settled team and there were a number of new arrivals at the end of the season including Gilbert Parkhouse, Jim Eaglestone, Norman Hever and Phil Clift. This might suggest a club in transition but there were grounds for optimism which were realised in 1948 when the club won its first championship. Glamorgan's bowling in 1947 suffered an early blow when their only real pace bowler Peter Judge was ruled out for the season after being injured in only the second match. Dynamic captain Wilf Wooller had to carry the seam attack almost single-handedly and took 85 wickets in addition to scoring 1,270 runs. Glamorgan relied mostly on spin with Len Muncer and the veteran Johnnie Clay bowling off breaks and opening batsman Emrys Davies helping out with his slow left. Davies created a county record by scoring five centuries in the season and formed an effective opening partnership with Arnold Dyson, both of them scoring more than 1,500 runs in the championship. Future Test player Allan Watkins exceeded 1,000 runs and there were some good innings by Wat Jones and George Lavis. The main wicketkeeper was Haydn Davies who claimed 47 victims in the championship but had some problems with a damaged hand. Other players included veteran Austin Matthews in his final season, Jim Pleass, Arthur Porter and Maurice Robinson.

Most of Glamorgan' home matches were played at one of their two main venues in Cardiff and Swansea but they occasionally played elsewhere. The four venues used were:
 Cardiff Arms Park, Cardiff
 Eugene Cross Park, Ebbw Vale
 Rodney Parade, Newport
 St Helen's Cricket Ground, Swansea

Sussex
Playfair emphasised the contrast between strong batting and weak bowling at Sussex who recovered from bottom place in 1946 to finish a creditable equal ninth. Only Jim Cornford performed consistently well among the bowlers while six batsmen scored over 1,000 runs. Three of these exceeded 2,000 in all matches: John Langridge, George Cox and Harry Parks. James Langridge reached the thousand despite missing several matches due to appendicitis. Charles Oakes and new captain Hugh Bartlett were the other two. His predecessor turned club secretary Billy Griffith had a poor season with the bat but kept wicket well enough to be selected for England's winter tour. Other players who appeared were Paul Carey, Donald Smith, Jim Wood, Jack Oakes, John Nye and two future Test players Alan Oakman and David Sheppard.

Sussex generally played home matches at their County Ground headquarters in Hove and used five venues in all:
 Central Recreation Ground, Hastings
 Priory Park, Chichester
 County Cricket Ground, Hove
 Cricketfield Road Ground, Horsham
 The Saffrons, Eastbourne

Essex
Essex matches were noted for high scores as Essex themselves scored more runs than anyone except Middlesex but also conceded the most. Their two outstanding players were the cousins Peter and Ray Smith who both completed the double. These two, bowling leg break and off break respectively, effectively carried the Essex attack. Outstanding prospect Trevor Bailey was the sole pace bowler of any effect but he was only available in the latter half of the season and then injuries limited his bowling, though he topped the county's batting averages. The other all-rounder Frank Vigar took 59 championship wickets bowling leg breaks but was expensive. Bailey, Vigar and the Smiths were half of the eight Essex players who scored 1,000 runs in the season, the other four being captain Tom Pearce, Chick Cray, Dickie Dodds and Doug Insole. Wicketkeeper Tom Wade had a very good season with 77 victims, 38 of them stumped. Essex were also represented by Bill Dines, Bill Morris, Denys Wilcox, Dick Horsfall, Frank Rist, Harry Crabtree, Len Clark and Sonny Avery.

Essex continued their policy of playing matches throughout the county and home venues used in 1947 were:
Castle Park Cricket Ground, Colchester
Chalkwell Park, Westcliff-on-Sea
County Ground, Chelmsford
Old County Ground, Brentwood
Southchurch Park, Southend-on-Sea
Valentine's Park, Ilford
Vista Road Recreation Ground, Clacton-on-Sea

Nottinghamshire
Nottinghamshire, captained for the first time by William Sime, drew half of their matches and only the top three had less defeats. They lost Bill Voce early in the season to retirement and this placed a heavy burden on the remaining pace bowlers Arthur Jepson and Harold Butler. They did well, both taking over 100 wickets and Butler being picked for England, but they lacked support. The only other bowler to make any kind of impression was slow left armer Harry Winrow who took 56 championship wickets. Winrow was one of five batsmen to score 1,000 runs. The best of these by a distance was England's Joe Hardstaff junior who had an outstanding season, scoring 2,396 with seven centuries. Walter Keeton, Reg Simpson and Tom Reddick all topped 1,000 runs while Charles Harris was approaching the landmark when his season was ended early by illness. Wicketkeeper Eric Meads claimed 52 victims in championship matches. Cambridge University captain Guy Willatt batted well when available and young Peter Harvey, leg break and googly bowler, looked a good prospect, but Freddie Stocks did not fulfil the promise he showed in 1946. Nottinghamshire made exclusive use of their headquarters at Trent Bridge in Nottingham for their thirteen home matches.

Somerset
Somerset were captained for the only time by educator Jack Meyer but the team did not learn anything and dropped seven places from fourth in 1946 to equal eleventh. Even so, they pulled off some surprises by defeating champions Middlesex twice and inflicting on third-placed Lancashire their only loss of the season. Somerset were let down by their batting with only Harold Gimblett reliable through the season. Michael Walford played very well in the closing weeks when he became available and Playfair called him "the best amateur batsman in England on a firm wicket". The main bowler was veteran Arthur Wellard who was supported by all-rounders Bertie Buse and Johnny Lawrence, slow left armer Horace Hazell, captain Meyer and new pace bowler Maurice Tremlett. The veteran Wally Luckes kept wicket and claimed 55 championship victims. Other players were Bill Andrews in his final season, Frank Lee in his final season before becoming an umpire, Hugh Watts, George Woodhouse, Mandy Mitchell-Innes and Miles Coope.

Somerset generally played home matches at their County Ground headquarters in Taunton and used five venues in all:
 Agricultural Showgrounds, Frome
 Clarence Park, Weston-super-Mare
 County Ground, Taunton
 Recreation Ground, Bath
 Rowdens Road, Wells

Leicestershire
Leicestershire had fourteen defeats and finished fourteenth. In Les Berry, they had the only professional captain in the County Championship. In July, they were involved in two exciting finishes, first when Middlesex were set to score 66 in 25 minutes and got them, courtesy of Edrich and Compton, to win by ten wickets with only four minutes to spare. Second, in their home match against Derbyshire, Leicestershire themselves succeeded in a run chase scoring 391 to win by three wickets at over eighty runs an hour, the winning run coming from a straight six off the third ball of the final over. Leicestershire were a strong batting side with Berry, Vic Jackson, Gerry Lester, Francis Prentice, Maurice Tompkin and George Watson all exceeding 1,000 runs while all-rounder Anthony Riddington scored over 800. Wicketkeeper Percy Corrall claimed 59 victims in championship matches. The main bowler was Jack Walsh, a great exponent of slow left-arm wrist-spin, who took 152 wickets in all matches. Jackson and the veteran James Sperry bowled well but Leicestershire's main need was a good pace bowler. Other players were Thomas Chapman, Jack Howard and Harry Pickering.

Leicestershire played the majority of their home matches at their Grace Road headquarters in Leicester and used four venues in all:
 Egerton Park, Melton Mowbray
 Grace Road, Leicester
 Kirkby Road, Barwell
 Park Road, Loughborough

Warwickshire
Warwickshire, let down by unreliable batting, were captained by attacking batsman Peter Cranmer. Despite their lack of success, they attracted large crowds to Edgbaston. Their best players were Test spinner Eric Hollies and batsman Tom Dollery, who was to become captain as a professional in 1948, though Dollery had a relatively poor season in 1947. Warwickshire were well served by their bowlers. In addition to Hollies, these were three new caps in the two seamers Victor Cannings and Charles Grove; and the New Zealand pace bowler Tom Pritchard. Dollery had to play as wicketkeeper in several matches when Cyril Goodway was unavailable. Playfair commented on advantages gained by the bowlers being "squandered" by inconsistent and unreliable batsmen. Five batsmen did exceed 1,000 runs but none had a good average: Cranmer, Dollery, Aubrey Hill, Jimmy Ord and Ken Taylor. Other players were Bill Fantham, John Hossell and Ron Maudsley. Warwickshire played eleven home matches at their Edgbaston headquarters in Birmingham and two matches at the Courtaulds Ground in Coventry.

Hampshire
Hampshire, a very ordinary side who bowled badly, were captained by Desmond Eagar. The batting was occasionally good and top of the county's averages was wicketkeeper Neil McCorkell who scored 1,539 championship runs and claimed 49 victims. Neville Rogers and Johnny Arnold played some good innings to both comfortably exceed 1,000 runs. Eagar and Gerry Hill both reached 1,000 with low averages and the all-rounder Jim Bailey, who took 53 wickets, fell just short of 1,000 runs. Playfair considered "the steady and loyal George Heath" to be the best of the bowlers who included Bailey, Hill, Victor Ransom, Lofty Herman and the injury-plagued Charles Knott. Other players included Gilbert Dawson, Thomas Dean, Arthur Holt, Alan Shirreff and future stalwart Leo Harrison.

Hampshire's home matches were shared between three venues:
 County Ground, Southampton
 Dean Park Cricket Ground, Bournemouth
 United Services Recreation Ground, Portsmouth

Northamptonshire
Northamptonshire slipped from sixteenth to bottom and were captained by Arthur Childs-Clarke. Dennis Brookes was the pick of the batsmen and earned a trip to the West Indies in the winter. Bill Barron, Percy Davis and John Timms also topped 1,000 runs but with low averages. Vince Broderick put in a sound all-round effort with 860 runs and 87 wickets while the best bowler was West Indian Test player Bertie Clarke with 89 wickets. The attack was hampered by injuries to Nobby Clark who did not play often. Wicketkeeper Kenneth Fiddling claimed 40 victims. Other players included Leo Bennett, Robert Clarke, Arthur Cox, Eddie Davis, William Nevell and Jack Webster.

Northamptonshire played nine of their thirteen home matches at their County Ground headquarters in Northampton and used five venues in all:
 County Cricket Ground, Northampton
 Town Ground, Kettering
 Town Ground, Peterborough
 Town Ground, Rushden
 Wellingborough School Ground, Wellingborough

Other major fixtures

MCC v Yorkshire
At the beginning of the season, on 3, 5 and 6 May, Marylebone Cricket Club (MCC) played a three-day match at Lord's against the 1946 county champions, Yorkshire. MCC won by 163 runs. The MCC team in batting order was Dennis Brookes (Northamptonshire), Jack Robertson (Middlesex), Bob Wyatt (Worcestershire), Denis Compton (Middlesex), Bryan Valentine (Kent, captain), Leslie Compton (Middlesex, wicketkeeper), Wilf Wooller (Glamorgan), Haydn Davies (Glamorgan), Jack Young (Middlesex), Rowland Shaddick (Middlesex) and Jack Martin (Kent). MCC won the toss and chose to bat first but were bowled out in 57 overs for 134, Denis Compton making 73. Yorkshire got off to a very bad start when Len Hutton was dismissed by Jack Martin for nought. This began an outstanding spell for Martin who finished with six for 23 from 12.1 overs as Yorkshire collapsed to 81 all out. At close of play on the Saturday, MCC were 67 for one with Jack Robertson 36 not out. On the Monday, Robertson built a big innings and scored 164 of a declared total of 343 for 9. Yorkshire's hopes slumped when Hutton was again dismissed cheaply and at close of play they were 69 for two. Vic Wilson tried his best and scored 74, which was his highest career score to date, but Jack Young was in fine form and took six for 85 to win the match for MCC.

University Match
The 1947 University Match between Oxford University and Cambridge University was played at Lord's over three days from 5 to 8 July and was drawn. Oxford batted first and amassed 457 with Kent's Tony Pawson scoring a chanceless 135 before being run out. Geoffrey Keighley made 99 and Test batsman Martin Donnelly 81. Cambridge could manage only 201 in reply as Oxford's other Test player Abdul Hafeez Kardar took four for 50. Following on, Cambridge rallied to 314 for four and ensured the draw, Guy Willatt scoring 90 and Trevor Bailey 60 not out.

Donnelly (New Zealand) and Kardar (India) both played Test cricket before winning their "Blues" and no university team had ever before included two Test players in the same year. Cambridge had a notable future Test player in Trevor Bailey (England). Donnelly was the first university batsman ever to score 1,000 runs before the University Match in two successive seasons. Playfair praised Donnelly as "the finest left-hand batsman in the world", ahead of even the Australians Arthur Morris and Neil Harvey.

Gentlemen v Players
There were two Gentlemen v Players matches in 1947. The first was played at Lord's over three days from 16 to 18 July and was drawn after rain restricted play on the last two days. The second was played at the North Marine Road ground in Scarborough from 10 to 12 September and the Players won by an innings and 10 runs.

Martin Donnelly dominated the Lord's match with "a truly magnificent innings", scoring 162 not out as the Gentlemen made 302 in the first innings, Bill Edrich scoring 79. The Players replied with 334 for eight declared, Cyril Washbrook scoring 101 and David Fletcher 77. The Gentlemen slumped to 25 for five as wickets fell to Cliff Gladwin and Harold Butler but were rescued by Norman Yardley and Ken Cranston, rain ensuring that the result was a draw. The Gentlemen were led by England captain Norman Yardley and selected three Oxford University players — Donnelly, Tony Pawson and Tony Mallett — and two from Cambridge University: Guy Willatt and Trevor Bailey. The team included current England players Edrich and Cranston while Billy Griffith kept wicket. Reg Simpson made his first appearance in the fixture but could only score 4 and 0. The Players were captained by Les Ames who played as a batsman, Godfrey Evans keeping wicket. Washbrook opened with Jack Robertson, the other batsmen being Denis Compton, Charlie Barnett and Fletcher. The pace bowlers were Butler and Gladwin, supported by spinners Jack Walsh and Doug Wright.

At Scarborough two months later, a much weaker Gentlemen team were easily beaten by an innings after totalling 135 and 217 against 362. Denys Wilcox opened the innings and did well with scores of 25 and 57 while skipper Yardley made 35 and 23, but Edrich and Donnelly did not contribute many against a strong Players attack, particularly Dick Howorth who took four wickets in each innings. The Players had three England pace bowlers: Butler, Alec Bedser and Dick Pollard. Howorth top-scored for the Players too, with 80, and captain Len Hutton scored 64.

North v South
There were three North v South matches in 1947, involving largely makeshift teams, and Playfair did not bother to report on them. The first was at the St George's Road Cricket Ground, Harrogate over three days from 27 to 29 August and the North won by 86 runs. The second was played at the Leyland Motors Ground in Kingston-upon-Thames from 3 to 5 September and the South won by 4 wickets. The final match was played at North Marine Road Ground, Scarborough from 6 to 9 September and was drawn.

Middlesex v The Rest
Having won the County Championship, Middlesex played a representative team called The Rest (i.e., the Rest of England) at The Oval in a four-day match lasting from 13 to 17 September. Middlesex won by 9 wickets. The Rest was a very strong team entirely consisting of players who had played or would play for England at Test level. In batting order, they were Cyril Washbrook, Winston Place, Dick Howorth, George Emmett, Norman Yardley (captain), Ken Cranston, Godfrey Evans (wicketkeeper), Alec Bedser, Doug Wright, Tom Goddard and Harold Butler. Middlesex won the toss and decided to bat first but were soon reduced to 8 for two as Bedser dismissed both openers Syd Brown and Jack Robertson. Bill Edrich and George Mann took the score on to 53 for three when Mann, who had scored 33, was stumped by Evans off Wright. This brought Edrich and Denis Compton together. In keeping with their form throughout the season, they amassed 426 runs between them and enabled skipper Walter Robins to declare at 543 for nine. Edrich made 180 which was just enough for him to surpass Tom Hayward's old record season aggregate, which Compton had already beaten. Compton retired hurt when he had scored 55 and the total was 191 for three. He returned with his knee strapped when the score was 274 for four and, despite his injury, he went on to make 246, his highest score of the season. Robins made 33 while Compton was off the field but the tailenders did not score many. The Rest were bowled out for 246 and followed on. They made 317 in their second innings, leaving Middlesex to win the match with 21 for one.

Minor Counties Championship
Six first-class clubs entered their "second elevens" into the Minor Counties Championship in 1947 and Playfair reported that five more would do so in 1948. Teams played each other irregularly and a league table was compiled on the basis of average points per match played. A win was worth ten points with lesser awards given in certain specific circumstances. All teams played at least eight matches, the most being fourteen by Yorkshire II. The leading teams in the table were Surrey II, Yorkshire II, Lancashire II, Staffordshire, Suffolk and Oxfordshire who each exceeded five points per match.

To decide the championship, a challenge match took place at The Oval on 4 to 6 September and Yorkshire II defeated Surrey II by 111 runs. Future first-class players taking part included Tony Lock, Vic Wilson, Stuart Surridge, Ron Aspinall and Bernie Constable.

Compton and Edrich
Playfair described 1947 as "the Edrich and Compton year" and remarked that their domination of first-class cricket through the season was unprecedented. Between them, they scored 7,355 runs, took 140 wickets and held 66 catches. It is improbable that the records achieved by Compton of most runs and most centuries in a season will ever be broken, especially since the reduction in first-class matches which began in 1969. What will be remembered is not the statistics but the style because Compton and Edrich scored quickly and played attacking cricket.

Playfair described Compton as "a genius" who was brilliant at improvisation; Edrich on the other hand was "not a genius but a wonderfully efficient batsman". Both men were hampered by injuries. Compton had a bad knee caused by a piece of chipped bone which was removed after the season ended. Edrich suffered a pulled shoulder muscle in early August which impeded his batting and prevented him from bowling again. When the season began in May, Edrich scored a century in his first innings and followed up with two more, including a score of 225, before the end of the month. Compton did not score his first century until his eleventh innings. Edrich scored 1,047 runs in the calendar month of July and Compton 1,039 runs in August. Edrich's highest score was 267 not out for Middlesex against Northamptonshire and Compton's was 246 for Middlesex against The Rest.

Wisden published an appreciation of Compton and Edrich written by R. C. Robertson-Glasgow who began by opining that "they go together in English cricket as Gilbert and Sullivan go together in English opera". Robertson-Glasgow made further comparisons, strictly cricket ones this time, with Jack Hobbs and Herbert Sutcliffe for England and with Don Bradman and Bill Ponsford for Australia. However, he tempered his praise by pointing out that Compton and Edrich had yet to "quell the fiercest Test attack" as, although they had dominated the South African bowling in 1947, Australia remained another matter with "fulfilment awaited". While Playfair spoke of "brilliance and efficiency", Robertson-Glasgow eulogised about "genius and talent" and then "poetry and prose" in comparing Compton with Edrich. He concluded by describing them as "fitting adornments and exponents" of cricket, itself a "refreshment from worldly struggle".

Wisden Cricketers of the Year
In its 1948 edition, Wisden Cricketers' Almanack announced that its five cricketers of the 1947 season were Martin Donnelly, Alan Melville, Dudley Nourse, Jack Robertson and Norman Yardley. As a rule, though it has occasionally been broken, Wisden never selects a player more than once. Among players of 1947 who had been selected previously were Les Ames in 1929; Walter Robins in 1930; Bill Bowes in 1932; Bruce Mitchell in 1936; Tom Goddard, Joe Hardstaff junior and Len Hutton in 1938; Denis Compton in 1939; Bill Edrich and Doug Wright in 1940; Peter Smith and Cyril Washbrook in 1947.

Martin Donnelly was rated by Wisden as "the world's best present-day left-handed batsman". Although small in stature, Donnelly was noted for powerful stroke play using the drive, pull and cut shots. Donnelly dominated university cricket in 1947 but his outstanding performance was "an almost faultless 162 not out in three hours" for the Gentlemen against the Players at Lord's. Donnelly was a New Zealand Test batsman who had starred for the Dominions team in 1945.

Alan Melville's career was dogged by injury and family illness. Wisden reflected this by opening its citation with "a story of courage and determination". In 1947, Melville won admiration for his "feeling for the spirit of the game" which was a significant factor in ensuring the success of "a most delightful Test series". Melville enjoyed personal success as a batsman in 1947, especially by scoring centuries at both Trent Bridge and Lord's. Melville was a strong onside batsman, noted for his fine timing. He retired from first-class cricket after the 1947 tour.

Dudley Nourse, son of Dave Nourse, had his best Test series as a batsman in 1947 with 621 runs and two centuries. He was an aggressive batsman, noted for his powerful hitting off the back foot. He played the cut and hook shots especially well. Nourse was an expert fielder, rated by Wisden as one of the best in world cricket. As vice-captain in 1947, he was Melville's expected successor.

Jack Robertson "surpassed all reasonable anticipations" in 1947 when his aggregate of 2,760 runs was exceeded only by his colleagues Compton and Edrich. Robertson was noted for "elegant strokeplay" and was strong on the back foot, especially his skill in playing the ball off his legs. Wisden saw "a striking resemblance" between Robertson and his Middlesex predecessor J. W. Hearne who was another polished performer adept at shot placement.

Norman Yardley was selected for his successful captaincy of England in 1947 after he succeeded Wally Hammond. Wisden said his appointment as England captain "set a crown upon a cricket career that (always) promised distinction". Yardley was primarily a batsman, noted for "watching the ball carefully and hitting it hard", but Wisden also praised his fielding in all positions and the consistency of length and direction in his bowling.

Achievements

Teams
Three teams scored more than 600 runs in an innings:
 706 for 4 – Surrey v Nottinghamshire (Trent Bridge)
 662 for 8 – Nottinghamshire v Essex (Trent Bridge)
 637 for 4 – Middlesex v Leicestershire (Leicester)

The lowest innings total of the season was 25 by Somerset against Gloucestershire at Bristol.

Batting

Of batsmen who played at least ten innings, twelve averaged 50.00 or more.

In total, 91 batsmen scored 1,000 runs in the season. Of these, seventeen scored 2,000-plus.

Compton's 3,816 runs and his 18 centuries are records for an English first-class cricket season. Edrich's 3,539 runs is the second highest aggregate of all time in a single season. Compton's two records were previously held by Tom Hayward, who scored 3,518 runs (including 13 centuries) in 1906, and Jack Hobbs, who completed 16 centuries (among 3,024 runs) in 1925.

Between them, the Middlesex trio of Compton, Edrich and Robertson scored 42 centuries in the season but none of them scored two in the same match. This feat was achieved eight times:

 Les Berry (Leicestershire) – 165 and 111 not out versus Essex (Clacton)
 George Emmett (Gloucestershire) – 115 and 103 not out versus Leicestershire (Leicester)
 Len Hutton (Yorkshire) – 197 and 104 versus Essex (Southend)
 Ted Lester (Yorkshire) – 126 and 142 versus Northamptonshire (Northampton)
 Alan Melville (South Africa) – 189 and 104 not out versus England (Trent Bridge)
 Bruce Mitchell (South Africa) – 120 and 189 not out versus England (The Oval)
 Winston Place (Lancashire) – 105 and 132 not out versus Nottinghamshire (Old Trafford)
 Cyril Washbrook (Lancashire) – 176 and 121 not out versus Sussex (Eastbourne)

A total of 26 double-centuries were scored, Bill Edrich and Joe Hardstaff making the most with three each. The highest individual innings was 270 not out by Len Hutton for Yorkshire against Hampshire at Bournemouth.

Bowling

Of bowlers who took fifty or more wickets, twelve achieved an average less than 20.

22 players took 100 wickets or more in the season and six of these took over 150 wickets.

There were twelve hat-tricks in the season and six instances of three wickets taken in four balls. Tom Goddard did the hat-trick twice, against Glamorgan at Swansea and Somerset at Bristol, and Doug Wright once, against Sussex at Hastings, which meant that they equalled the world career hat-trick record of six, set by Charlie Parker.

Tom Goddard had the best bowling analysis of the season when he took nine for 41 against Nottinghamshire at Bristol. His colleague Sam Cook was second-best with nine for 42 against Yorkshire, also at Bristol. Three other bowlers — Peter Smith, Len Muncer and Cliff Gladwin — took nine in an innings and there were twelve instances of eight in an innings, including three by Goddard. Goddard took fifteen wickets in a match three times but the best match analysis was sixteen for 215 by Peter Smith for Essex against Middlesex at Colchester. Arthur Wellard and Doug Wright took fifteen wickets in a match once apiece.

All-round
Three players completed the season "double" of 1,000 runs scored and 100 wickets taken:
 Dick Howorth (Worcestershire) scored 1,510 runs and took 164 wickets, achieving the double on 7 August
 Ray Smith (Essex) – 1,386 runs and 125 wickets (12 August)
 Peter Smith (Essex) – 1,065 runs and 172 wickets (28 August)

Fielding and wicketkeeping
Five fielders held more than forty catches in the season:
 48 – Jack Crapp (Gloucestershire; 30 matches)	
 46 – John Langridge (Sussex; 29)	
 43 – Basil Allen (Gloucestershire; 30)	
 41 – Arthur Fagg (Kent; 29)	
 41 – Jack Walsh (Leicestershire; 27)

Four wicketkeepers held more than fifty catches:
 68 – Godfrey Evans (Kent; 28 matches; 25 st)
 61 – Leslie Compton (Middlesex; 30 matches; 18 st)
 53 – Billy Griffith (Sussex; 30 matches; 7 st)
 51 – Arthur McIntyre (Surrey; 24 matches; 5 st)

Three wicketkeepers completed more than thirty stumpings:
 40 – Hugo Yarnold (Worcestershire; 31 matches; 48 ct)
 38 – Tom Wade (Essex; 28 matches; 39 ct)
 31 – Andy Wilson (Gloucestershire; 29 matches; 32 ct)

Most wicketkeeping victims overall:
 93 – Godfrey Evans (Kent)
 88 – Hugo Yarnold (Worcestershire)
 79 – Leslie Compton (Middlesex)
 77 – Tom Wade (Essex)
 63 – Andy Wilson (Gloucestershire)

Footnote

• a) The Wisden Cricketers of the Year for 1947 were announced in the 1948 edition of Wisden Cricketers' Almanack.

References

Sources
 Playfair Cricket Annual, 1st edition, editor Peter West, Playfair Books, 1948
 Wisden Cricketers' Almanack, 85th edition, editor Hubert Preston, Sporting Handbooks Ltd, 1948

Further reading
 
 
 
 
 
 Wisden Cricketers' Almanack, 84th edition, editor Hubert Preston, Sporting Handbooks Ltd, 1947

External links
 Wisden Online — 1948
 CricketArchive — season summary

1947 in English cricket
English cricket seasons in the 20th century